Macedonia (officially under the provisional appellation "former Yugoslav Republic of Macedonia", abbreviated "FYR Macedonia") participated in the Eurovision Song Contest 2006 with the song "Ninanajna" written by Darko Dimitrov and Rade Vrčakovski. The song was performed by Elena Risteska. The Macedonian broadcaster Macedonian Radio Television (MRT) organised the national final Specialen Evroviziski Den in order to select the Macedonian entry for the 2006 contest in Athens, Greece. Twenty entries competed in the competition on 4 March 2006 where "Ninanajna" performed by Elena Risteska was selected exclusively by a public televote, receiving 6,999 votes.  

Macedonia competed in the semi-final of the Eurovision Song Contest which took place on 18 May 2006. Performing during the show in position 11, "Ninanajna" was announced among the top 10 entries of the semi-final and therefore qualified to compete in the final on 20 May. It was later revealed that Macedonia placed tenth out of the 23 participating countries in the semi-final with 76 points. In the final, Macedonia performed in position 11 and placed twelfth out of the 24 participating countries, scoring 56 points.

Background

The nation's best result in the contest to this point was fourteenth, which it achieved in 2004 with the song "Life" performed by Toše Proeski.

The Macedonian national broadcaster, Macedonian Radio Television (MRT), broadcasts the event within Macedonia and organises the selection process for the nation's entry. Macedonia had previously selected their entry for the Eurovision Song Contest through both national finals and internal selections. MRT confirmed their intentions to participate at the 2006 Eurovision Song Contest on 20 December 2005. Since 1996, Macedonia selected their entries using a national final, a procedure that continued for their 2006 entry.

Before Eurovision

Specialen Evroviziski Den 
Specialen Evroviziski Den ("Special Eurovision Day") was the national final organised by MRT that selected Macedonia's entry for the Eurovision Song Contest 2006. Twenty entries participated in the competition which took place on 4 March 2006 at Studios 2 and 3 of MRT in Skopje, hosted by Biljana Dragičević and Zoran Ljutkov and was broadcast on MTV 1 and MTV Sat.

Competing entries 
A submission period was opened for interested artists and composers to submit their songs between 20 December 2005 and 15 January 2006. MRT received 51 submissions at the closing of the deadline and twenty entries were selected by a four-member committee consisting of Ilija Pejovski (composer and conductor), Trajče Organdžiev (MRT), Avni Veliu (MRT) and Susana Pavlovska (MRT). The twenty competing artists and songs were announced on 23 January 2006 during a press conference.

Final 
The final took place on 4 March 2006. The running order was determined through a draw held on 27 January 2006 during the MRT programme Urban Šik. Twenty entries competed and public televoting exclusively selected "Ninanajna" performed by Elena Risteska as the winner. In addition to the performances of the competing entries, the competition featured a guest performance by the Rebis Ballet Studio.

Promotion 
Elena Risteska specifically promoted "Ninanajna" as the Macedonian Eurovision entry on 11 March 2006 by performing the song during the Serbian and Montenegrin Eurovision national final Evropesma-Europjesma 2006.

At Eurovision 
According to Eurovision rules, all nations with the exceptions of the host country, the "Big Four" (France, Germany, Spain and the United Kingdom) and the ten highest placed finishers in the 2005 contest are required to qualify from the semi-final on 18 May 2006 in order to compete for the final on 20 May 2006; the top ten countries from the semi-final progress to the final. On 21 March 2006, a special allocation draw was held which determined the running order for the semi-final and Macedonia was set to perform in position 11, following the entry from Monaco and before the entry from Poland. At the end of the show, Macedonia was announced as having finished in the top 10 and subsequently qualifying for the grand final. It was later revealed that Macedonia placed tenth in the semi-final, receiving a total of 76 points. The draw for the running order for the final was done by the presenters during the announcement of the ten qualifying countries during the semi-final and Macedonia was drawn to perform in position 11, following the entry from Russia and before the entry from Romania. Macedonia placed twelfth in the final, scoring 56 points.

The semi-final and final were broadcast in Macedonia on MTV 1 and MTV Sat with commentary by Karolina Petkovska. The Macedonian spokesperson, who announced the Macedonian votes during the final, was Martin Vučić who previously represented Macedonia at the contest in 2005.

Voting 
Below is a breakdown of points awarded to Macedonia and awarded by Macedonia in the semi-final and grand final of the contest. The nation awarded its 12 points to Albania in the semi-final and to Bosnia and Herzegovina in the final of the contest.

Points awarded to Macedonia

Points awarded by Macedonia

References

2006
Countries in the Eurovision Song Contest 2006
Eurovision